Brenda Withers is an American playwright and actress. Withers grew up in Long Island, New York, and graduated from Dartmouth College in 2000. She is close friends with Mindy Kaling, whom she met when they were both attending Dartmouth. In 2001, Withers and Kaling co-wrote the play Matt & Ben, a play in which Withers and Kaling star as Matt Damon and Ben Affleck, respectively. The play debuted in 2002 at that year's New York International Fringe Festival, where it became a surprise hit and won the "Best in Fringe" award. It began an Off Broadway run in 2003, which led to it receiving multiple favorable reviews, including from the New Yorker. In one of the show's Off Broadway productions, in a scene in which Kaling was supposed to fake a choreographed punch to Withers's face, Kaling accidentally punched Withers so hard that she broke her nose and had to go to the hospital. After an intermission, the play continued. In 2006, Withers appeared in the "Booze Cruise" episode of The Office.

She has also acted in stage productions of Crimes of the Heart, The Philadelphia Story, and Abundance.  In 2011, her play The Ding Dongs or What is the Penalty in Portugal? premiered at the Wellfleet Harbor Actors Theatre, where she was a company member and playwright at the time. She later co-founded the Harbor Stage Company, a theater in Wellfleet, Massachusetts which she helps to run. In 2016, her play The Kritik premiered there.

References

External links

Living people
American stage actresses
American women dramatists and playwrights
Dartmouth College alumni
People from Long Island
American comedy writers
21st-century American dramatists and playwrights
21st-century American actresses
Year of birth missing (living people)